Volt France (abbreviation: Volt) is a social liberal political party in France and the French branch of Volt Europa.

Policies 
The main focus of Volt is the reform and further development of the European Union, which should become more transparent and participatory. The party wants to make the structures of the EU more democratic and have the EU President elected directly. The European Parliament should be given the right of initiative to enact laws itself and establish majority decisions in the European Council instead of unanimity.

This is to be accompanied by a common European security and defence policy, the promotion of the green economy and the strengthening of workers' rights.

Volt criticised the implementation of the pension reform and called for the continuation of debates in parliament and the organisation of public debates like the one on climate change in order to build public consensus and greater solidarity between generations.

History 
Volt France was founded in February 2018 and officially registered as a party in August of the same year. The motivation for the founding was increasing populism throughout Europe, which worried the founders and culminated in Brexit. Therefore, they felt it was their responsibility to take action to move Europe forward.

The party initially planned to contest the 2019 European elections with Colombe Cahen-Salvador and Louis Drounau as leading candidates and drew up a list for this. However, due to a lack of funding, the party was unable to contest. For the first time, the party contested the 2020 local elections in different cities.

In October 2021, Fabiola Conti and Sven Franck were elected as chairpersons.

Elections

Local elections 2020 
Volt participated in the 2020 French municipal elections in some cities, but did not achieve a mandate:

 In Paris, Volt contested in the 9th district with its own list and achieved 0.52% in the first round.
 In Lyon, the party contested together with 100% Citoyens and they achieved 4.15% of the vote.
 In Lille, Volt stood for election in the alliance LilleVerte2020 together with l'EELV, Génération.s, Génération Écologie and Diem25. The list received 24.3% and 18 mandates, none of which, however, went to Volt.

Regional and local elections 2021 
Volt participated in the 2021 regional elections in the Île-de-France region with a list consisting of Volt, Pace-Nous Citoyen, A Nous al Démocatie and obtained 0.17% (3 629 votes). In the Hauts-de-France region, the joint list of Pace, Volt, Allons Enfants and Nous Citoyens reached 0.5% (6 700 votes). In both regions, the second round was not reached.

In Brittany, Volt put forward a joint list of LREM, TdP, MoDem, UDI, Agir and Volt, which achieved 15.53% in the first round, 14.75% in the second round and 9 mandates, none of which, however, went to Volt.

The party also participated in departmental elections in Strasbourg 1 (1.16%) and in Aix-en-Provence-2 (0.59%).

Parliamentary election 2022 
In the 2022 parliamentary elections, Volt participated in 12 of the 566 constituencies in France and overseas territories and in 5 of the 11 constituencies for French citizens abroad. In total, Volt was represented by candidates in 17 out of 577 constituencies.

The party achieved its best result in the national constituencies in the 5th constituency of the département of Pyrénées-Atlantiques with 3.25%. Volt's best overall election result was in the 7th constituency of the French Abroad (Central Europe) with 4.97%.

After the election, controversy arose in Nantes after some of the ballot papers for Volt were not delivered, so that in some polling stations no ballot papers for Volt were available. The party then filed a complaint with the Constitutional Council.

External links 

 Website Volt France

References 

France
Political parties in France
Political parties established in 2018
2018 establishments in France
Organizations based in Paris
Pro-European political parties in France
Centrist parties in France